Bchennine, Bchannine,    is a village in Zgharta District, in the Northern Governorate of Lebanon.  Its population is predominantly Maronite Catholic.

References

External links
Ehden Family Tree 

Populated places in the North Governorate
Zgharta District
Maronite Christian communities in Lebanon